The 1990 CECAFA Cup was the 17th edition of the CECAFA Cup, which involves teams from Southern and Central Africa. The tournament was held in Zanzibar.

Group A

Group B

Knock-out stages

Semi-finals

Third Place Play Off

Final

Team Statistics

References

CECAFA Cup